E. cornutus may refer to:
 Eleutherodactylus cornutus, a frog species
 Eobasileus cornutus, an extinct mammal species
 Epiphanis cornutus, a beetle species in the genus Epiphanis
 Eriauchenius cornutus, a spider species in the genus eriauchenius
 Eunymphicus cornutus, a parakeet species
 Euonymus cornutus, a tree species in the genus Euonymus

See also
 Cornutus (disambiguation)